Techelsberg (Slovene: Teholica) is a municipality in the district of Klagenfurt-Land in the Austrian state of Carinthia.

Geography 
Techelsberg reaches from the southern edge of the Ossiacher Tauern to the northern shore of Lake Wörth.

References 

Cities and towns in Klagenfurt-Land District